Biological warfare (BW)—also known as bacteriological warfare, or germ warfare—has had a presence in popular culture for over 100 years. Public interest in it became intense during the Cold War, especially the 1960s and '70s, and continues unabated. This article comprises a list of popular culture works referencing BW or bioterrorism, but not those pertaining to natural, or unintentional, epidemics.

Literature

(Chronological, then alphabetical within years)

 In the novel La Guerre au vingtième siècle ("The War in the Twentieth Century"; written 1863, published 1883), by Albert Robida, an "Offensive Medical Corps, composed of chemical engineers, doctors and an apothecary" plan to deploy "twelve mines loaded with concentrated miasms and microbes of malignant fever, farcin, dysentery, measles, acute odontalgia and other diseases". Australia and Mozambique are the combatants.
 In More New Arabian Nights: The Dynamiter (1885) — a collection of linked short stories by Robert Louis Stevenson and Fanny van der Grift Stevenson — it is suggested by the anarchist narrator that the sewage systems of British cities be contaminated with typhoid bacilli.
 In the novel The Germ Growers (1892), by Australian clergyman Robert Potter, a covert invasion of the earth by extraterrestrials involves the development of a virulent infectious disease to facilitate a global conquest.
 In H.G. Wells's short story "The Stolen Bacillus" (1894), "the Bacteriologist" naively gives "the Anarchist" opportunity to steal a vial of deadly "Asiatic Cholera" bacilli with which he threatens to decimate London by introducing it into the city water supply.
 In the early science fiction novel Zalma (1895) by British author Thomas Mullett Ellis, evil scientists deploy anthrax-laden balloons, possibly resulting in a pan-European socialist upheaval. 
 The British novel The Yellow Danger (1898), by M. P. Shiel, is an example of Yellow Peril propaganda (the subtitle is Or, what Might Happen in the Division of the Chinese Empire Should Estrange all European Countries). But in this racist and jingoistic tale, it is the heroic white protagonist who infects and kills millions of invading Asians with plague, causing him considerable remorse. (The book was an inspiration for the later Fu Manchu [see below] stories.)
 Jack London, in his short story "Yah! Yah! Yah!" (1909), describes a fictional punitive European expedition to a South Pacific island that deliberately exposes a Polynesian population to the measles virus, causing many deaths. 
 In London's science fiction tale, "The Unparalleled Invasion" (1910), the Western nations wipe out all of China with a biological attack.
 Edgar Wallace's science fiction novel The Green Rust (1919) is a story of bio-terrorists who threaten to release an agent that will destroy the world's wheat crops. It was adapted the same year into the British silent film The Green Terror.
 Sax Rohmer's archvillain Dr. Fu Manchu (14 novels, 1913–1959), who disdains any use of guns or explosives, is proficient at use of bio-terrorism. (E.g., The Bride of Fu-Manchu (1933) in which a bio-weapon created by the Doctor causes an epidemic that sweeps the French Riviera; Emperor Fu-Manchu (1959) involving a Russian BW facility hidden deep in the Chinese jungle, etc.)
 In Aldous Huxley's science fiction novel Brave New World (1932), anthrax bombs are mentioned as the means by which modern society was terrorized and in large part replaced by a dystopian society.
 In L. Ron Hubbard's novel Final Blackout (1940), England has been laid waste by BW after a future world war; the lethal "Soldier's Sickness" necessitates quarantine of the entire country and development of a vaccine. 
 In the future war novel World Aflame: The Russian-American War of 1950 (1947) by Leonard Engel, both combatants eventually turn to BW after both nuclear and chemical weapons prove indecisive.
 In Philip Jose Farmer's 1952 science fiction novella The Lovers, seven-eighths of the world's population has previously been eradicated by an "artificial semivirus" causing an "artificial sickle cell anemia" which had been distributed by "guided missiles". Now, on another planet, puritanical and genocidal Earthmen plot to do the same to extraterrestrials.
 The Magellanic Cloud (Polish title: Obłok Magellana), a 1955 novel by Polish science fiction writer Stanisław Lem, includes an episode in which interstellar explorers belonging to a 32nd-century communist utopia discover a derelict 20th century spacecraft containing biological and nuclear weapons. These primitive remnants of extinct U.S. and NATO culture are duly destroyed by the more enlightened space voyagers.
 James Tiptree Jr.'s "The Last Flight of Dr. Ain" (1969) is a short science fiction tale about a scientist traveling the world releasing a virus targeted to eliminate humanity before it can destroy all life on Earth via climate change. 
 Tiptree's "The Screwfly Solution" (1977) is a short horror science fiction story about a disease that turns the human sex drive into a drive to kill.
 In Stephen King's novel The Stand (1978), a weaponized strain of influenza (officially known as Project Blue and nicknamed "Captain Trips") is accidentally released from a remote U.S. Army base.
 In Scott Asnin's disaster novel A Cold Wind from Orion (1980), a fallen satellite contains a BW threat. 
 In Frank Herbert's science fiction novel The White Plague (1982), a vengeful molecular biologist creates an artificial plague that kills only women, but for which men are the carriers. He releases it in Ireland (to support terrorists), in England (to oppress the Irish), and in Libya (to train said terrorists), and then holds the governments of the world hostage to his demands lest he release more plagues.
 In Tom Clancy's Executive Orders (1996), Iran attempts to use Shiva virus, a strain of Ebola thought to be airborne, to infect and devastate the population of the U.S. while the government is recovering from a separate issue from the events of the prior novel.
 Richard Preston's thriller The Cobra Event (1998) describes an attempted bioterrorist attack on the US with a genetically modified virus ("Cobra"), that fuses the incurable and highly contagious common cold virus with smallpox. The symptom of the resulting disease ("brain-pox") mimic Lesch–Nyhan syndrome, the common cold, and Nuclear Polyhedrosis Virus.
 In Tom Clancy's Rainbow Six (1998), the villain plans to deploy the Shiva virus, a mutated form of the Ebola virus that had been previously used by Iran during its BW attack on the U.S. (depicted in Executive Orders (1996)). 
 In the novel The Seventh Plague by James Rollins, the world is capsized in the Biblical plagues. It turns out to be the workings of an evil group, to stop which is the mission of The Sigma Force.
 In Suzanne Collins's book Gregor and the Curse of the Warmbloods (2005), there is a plague, which turns out to be a biological weapon which accidentally infected an innocent bystander prematurely.
 In Kevin Brockmeier's novel The Brief History of the Dead (2006), biological terrorists release a lethal virus which annihilates almost all of humanity.
 Matthew John Lee's thriller novel The Quick and the Dead (2008) depicts the aftermath of an attack on the British Isles using an enhanced smallpox virus. (The author is credited in later editions as John Matthew Lee.)
 Alex Scarrow's TimeRiders novels (2010–2014) feature the use of a biological weapon, code-named Kosong-ni Virus (after the village that was ground-zero for the virus), that destroys approximately 99% of life on Earth within a few weeks.
 In George R. R. Martin's fifth A Song of Ice and Fire novel, A Dance with Dragons (2011), the Yunkai army catapults corpses infected with Pale Mare, a fictional cholera-like disease, over the walls of Meereen as a form of BW. (See Gabriel de Mussis for the historical precedent to this.)
 Richard Powers' novel Orfeo (2014), tells the story of Peter Els, a contemporary composer accused of bioterrorism after biohacking musical patterns into the bacterial human pathogen Serratia marcescens.
 In Chris Ryan's novel Hellfire (2015), a joint bioterrorist plot by ISIS and Boko Haram involves attempting to release an aerosol of a genetically modified version of the plague bacterium Yersinia pestis during the London Marathon.
 In Terry Hayes's novel I Am Pilgrim (2015), there is an attempt to introduce a bio-engineered strain of smallpox virus into the US.
 In Scott Medbury's book series America Falls (2018), a Chinese engineered flu originally known as the "Pyongyang Flu" is deployed in the U.S., killing virtually all adults and sparing those younger than 17.

Comics/graphic novels
 In V for Vendetta Norsefire, a British ultranationalist party, creates the Larkhill Detention Center, where a bioweapon prototype is developed via human experimentation. With the goal of creating fear, paranoia and anger, Norsefire releases the bioweapon in a coordinated attack on London, in a Water Treatment and Distribution Plant, an Underground Station and the St. Mary Primary school, from which the virus takes its name. The resulting epidemic kills hundreds in days, and eventually tens of thousands in the British Isles. In the General Election Norsefire wins a landslide victory and deliberately releases the cure for the St. Mary's Virus, before claiming this to be an act of god.
 In IDW's Sonic the Hedgehog series, Dr. Eggman develops the Metal Virus, a manufactured contagion designed to turn organic matter into metallic matter. It's infected carriers, known as "Zombots", soon become disobedient towards Eggman in his attempt to control them. After revealing that the virus can't be cured, Eggman goes on to say that as the virus mutates, the infected begin to suffer apoptosis and will eventually disintegrate in 200 years.

Films

(Chronological, then alphabetical within years)
 In H.G. Wells' British science fiction film Things to Come (1936), the "wandering sickness" is "a new fever of mind and body" inflicted by aerial bombing as a last desperate measure in the year 1966; it causes victims to wander about in a zombie-like state and require mercy-killing. 
 In the British film thriller Counterblast (1948; US title Devil's Plot), a Nazi bacteriologist ("The Beast of Ravensbruck") escapes from a POW prison, murders a professor and takes his place at a research lab where he experiments with BW intending to wage the next war against the UK. No bio-agents are deployed in the storyline.
 In the American Cold War thriller The Whip Hand (1951; aka The Enemy Within), a strange isolated lodge on a lake island in Minnesota is the site of a mysterious fish die off. The lodge houses a lab and a Soviet plot, utilizing Nazi scientists, to release BW agents upon the USA. 
 In The Flesh Eaters (1964), a former US Government agent who was sent to Nazi Germany to recover microbes modified as BW, develops a horrific "flesh eating" variety on a secret island off Cape Cod. Accidental visitors help the scientist defeat the menace after it gets out of control.
 In The Satan Bug (1965), at "Station Three"—a top-secret US bioweapons lab in the Southern California desert—the protagonist investigates the murder of the security chief and the disappearances of the director and head scientist; two lethal bioweapons—a strain of "botulinus" and a recently developed virus (the "Satan Bug") which could wipe out the earth's population in months—are missing.
 On Her Majesty's Secret Service (1969), the sixth James Bond film, women are being brainwashed by the villain to disseminate biowarfare agents throughout the world.
 In The Andromeda Strain (1971), although the microbial threat in this science fiction film is a natural one returning to Earth with a satellite, the scientific response team comes across germ warfare simulations, strongly indicating that the responsible US government projects were designed to actively search for harmful bioagents for use in BW.
 In The Omega Man (1971), a science fiction film starring Charlton Heston, in 1975, BW between China and Russia kills most of the world's population. The protagonist, a U.S. Army scientist/physician, renders himself immune with an experimental vaccine. (In Richard Matheson's source novel, I Am Legend (1954), the plague is coincident with a great war, but it is unclear if it originated in BW.)
 The Crazies (1973), a U.S. Army plane carrying an untested bioweapon (a virus code-named "Trixie") crashes near a small Pennsylvania town contaminating the water; infected victims either die or become violently homicidal, and heavily armed U.S. troops in NBC suits and gas masks soon arrive. 
 In the Alien franchise of four American films—namely, Alien (1979), Aliens (1986), Alien 3 (1992), and Alien Resurrection (1997)—a key plot-driving element of the story background is that the "Bioweapons Division" of the sinister "Company" must have a specimen of the creature at all costs even at the expense of the "expendable" humans that get in its way. This is most fully developed in the fourth installment wherein a remote "Army Medical Lab" is attempting—as part of a secret military/commercial partnership—to tame the monster. It will be used in "urban pacification" as well as other, supposedly less malign, purposes, such as materials science and vaccines.
 In the Japanese film Virus (1980), a deadly virus ("MM88") created accidentally by an American geneticist amplifies the potency of any other virus or bacterium it comes into contact with; in 1982, MM88 has been stolen from a lab in the US, and a team of Americans vies with a shady East German scientist to recover it, but fail, and a pandemic, initially known as the "Italian Flu", results.
 In Men Behind the Sun (1988), a Hong Kong–Chinese historical war horror film graphically depicting war atrocities at the secret Japanese BW facility Unit 731, during World War II, details the various cruel medical experiments inflicted upon Chinese and Soviet POWs.
In The Blob (1988), an invading monster is the result of a U.S. Government BW experiment which was sent into outer space as too dangerous, but returned to the earth. (Note that the 1958 original, of which this film is a remake, did not have a BW element.) 
 In 12 Monkeys (1995), a deadly unnamed virus wipes out almost all of humanity in 1996, forcing the few survivors to live underground. A mysterious group of animal rights extremists, known as the Army of the Twelve Monkeys, is believed to have been responsible for the outbreak.
Mission Impossible 2 (2000) involves a special virus called Chimera. It kills people and there is only one vaccine vial.
 Resident Evil (2002-2017), a power-hungry and murderous-yet-terroristic megacorporation Umbrella Corporation is responsible for the first outbreak and release of the T-Virus which resulted in the first massacre at the hive, then in Raccoon City, and then the entire globe.
 28 Days Later (2002), where a deadly modified rage virus is released by an eco-terrorist in Cambridge, destroying the UK.
 Dasavathaaram (2008) is an Indian Tamil science fiction disaster film about a viral outbreak from a laboratory.
 Philosophy of a Knife (2008) is a Russian-American horror film covering the aforementioned Japanese Army's Unit 731, mixing archival footage, interviews, and extremely graphic reenactments of the vile experiments performed there during WWII.
 In The Crazies (2010 remake of the 1973 film), the water in a small Iowa town becomes contaminated with "Trixie"—a "Rhabdoviridae prototype" bioweapon—after a military cargo plane en route to an incinerator in Texas crashes; infected victims become cold, calculating, depraved, bloodthirsty killers.
 7aum Arivu (2011) is an Indian science fiction martial arts film about the spreading of an ancient virus.
 Jurassic World (2015), Jurassic World: Fallen Kingdom (2018), and Jurassic World Dominion (2021) are American science fiction films, with a plot of using genetically engineered dinosaurs as military animals.
 Inferno (2016), the third and final installment in the  
Robert Langdon film series, involves a viral superweapon dubbed "Inferno" that threatens the world.
In the 2018 movie Rampage, three genetically altered animals are developed in a lab by gene-manipulation company "Energyne" which secretly plans to use them in BW.
In No Time to Die (2021), the 25th James Bond film, Spectre kidnaps the BW scientist directing "Project Heracles", a British bio-weapon containing nanobots that infect like a virus upon touch; the 'bots are coded to an individual's DNA and lethal to the target (and relatives), but harmless to others.

Television

(Alphabetical by series)
 In The 100, season 1, episode 10, the Grounders infect the exiled Murphy with a hemorrhagic virus, then allow him to escape. While fleeing, he stumbles upon an area surrounding the Ark survivors' camp and infects those who make contact with him. They then unwittingly spread the virus throughout the camp, which sickens some members and kills others. Lincoln explains to Octavia the Grounders use the virus to "soften up" the enemy before attacking them.
 In Between a village is infected with a bioweapon, killing everyone over the age of 21, and the remaining people as soon as they become 21.
 In the season 2 finale of Blue Bloods, Frank must work with Homeland Security to prevent a terrorist attack that would infect New York City with a (presumably deadly) strain of flu. The attack is thwarted as the terrorists are arrested while attempting to enter the city. 
 Foyle's War, series 4, episode 2 (2006) features a minor outbreak of anthrax after biological weapons research during WWII escapes containment.
 In "Place of Angels" (1968), the 23rd episode of Captain Scarlet and the Mysterons (a British puppetry drama), at the "Bacteriological Research Centre" near Manchester, England, activation of a culture of "K14", a synthetic virus, threatens the lives of millions.
 In the Falling Skies penultimate episode, "Reunion" (August 23, 2015), an alien known as the Dornia gives the protagonist, Tom Mason, a bioweapon to end an alien invasion of the Earth. After Mason's wife Anne and friend Marty modify the virus to be harmless to humans, Tom sets out to deploy it in the series finale "Reborn" (August 30, 2015). Tom infects himself as the alien queen is draining him of his blood, so the virus passes through Tom's blood into her. As the queen is organically linked to her entire race, the bioweapon destroys them, freeing the Earth from oppression.
 In series 3 of [Orphan Black], Sarah explores further into the CASTOR clones and their purpose. She and Paul discover that the defect in the boys is being used as a weapon by sterilising women. Their mother Dr Virginia Coady says ‘we can end wars without losing single drop of blood’. 
 In the Sliders series finale, "The Seer" (2000), the main characters land on a world where their enemy, the Kromaggs, were wiped out with a bioweapon. One, Rembrandt Brown, injects himself with the virus (harmless to humans) and returns to Earth Prime in an unresolved cliffhanger in hopes of using it to free his homeworld.
 In Season 7 of Star Trek: Deep Space Nine, we find out about a disease which is killing off the Founders; this disease later turns out to have been caused intentionally by Section 31.
 In Season 4 of The Americans, Elizabeth and Philip Jennings must work with another KGB spy, William, to acquire and use deadly bioagents. In the first episode of the season, "Glanders", the two aim to acquire the deadly bacterium Burkholderia mallei. Throughout the season, endeavors like this continue and intensify, putting the characters in grave danger.
 In Season 4 episode 24 (2009) of Criminal Minds, the substance anthrax is released into the public and the BAU must find a cure before it is too late.
 In Swat Kats, a number of creatures are developed which are then used to harm society.
 In Season 3 of 24, an engineered virus dubbed the Cordilla Virus with an incubation period of only a few hours serves as the central threat for the entire season. The virus produces deadly and painful symptoms before swiftly leading to death, leading to it being sold and used as leverage against the US government by terrorists.

Video games

(Chronological, then alphabetical within years)

 In Resident Evil (1996–present), the titular Resident Evil originally was discovered through a plant that was taken by Umbrella Corporation, which starts the birth of the biological weapon known as T-virus, which mutates its victims into zombie-like creatures. Later installments of the game and other works in the franchise (e.g., films) saw the release of still more biological weapons over time, created mainly by the fictional Umbrella Corporation and various other organizations. The viruses are also often engineered to radically mutate the subjects into grotesque killing machines, referred to in-universe as B.O.W.s, short for bio-organic weapon.
 In Command & Conquer: Generals (2003), the Global Liberation Army (GLA) makes extensive use of biological weapons and has a general who specializes in bio and chemical warfare named Dr. Thrax. The GLA units such as the toxin tractor and toxin rebels spray toxins on enemy units and later use anthrax beta, a weaponized strain of anthrax. Anthrax beta is also used in Scud missiles and the air dropped anthrax bomb. Dr. Thrax's troops have access to the more potent anthrax gamma strain.
 In Act of War: Direct Action (2005) and its expansion the Consortium, a syndicate of corporations, PMCs and terrorists use a modified strain of Ebola known as Ebola II hemorrhagic fever strain causing the infected soldiers to lose health and die. It is often deployed by the Super-weapon Falling Star which drops satellites than can carry the weapon on enemy targets.
 In Crysis 2 (2011), a large outbreak of "Manhattan virus", a gruesome disease causing complete cellular breakdown, causes civil unrest; people panic upon an alien invasion by the Ceph, the tentacled, squid-like alien race from the previous game, Crysis (2007).
 In Plague Inc. (2012), a bio-weapon is featured as the last regular disease type. It grows progressively more lethal over time, a feature which the player must control.
 During the campaign in Call of Duty: Advanced Warfare (2014), Atlas CEO Johnathon Irons develops a bioweapon called Manticore, designed to attack all the population that is not in the Atlas database. Irons deployed the weapon late in the campaign, killing most of the Sentinel soldiers in New Baghdad planning to attack him.
 In Tom Clancy's The Division (2016), an eco-terrorist unleashed a heavily modified variant of smallpox in New York City, in a bid to kill a large portion of the population. The spread of the disease spiraled out of control, resulting in the complete breakdown of law and order and a rise of hostile factions in the city, mostly on Manhattan Island, which was ground zero of the virus.
 In the Mass Effect franchise, the genophage is an agent that genetically modified the Krogans to stop their aggressive expansion into Citadel Space. The agent made it difficult for Krogans to conceive children, however. Even when conceived, most Krogan pregnancies henceforth resulted in stillbirth.
 In the Metroid series, the Chozo race creates the Metroid to combat the X Parasite on SR388. The Space Pirates try to capture and breed Metroids and use them as bioweapons, but their plans are foiled by Samus Aran several times: once in Metroid (1986), in Metroid Prime (2002) and another time in Super Metroid (1994). At the end of the events of Metroid Fusion (2002), the last Metroid is killed, ending the threat of Metroids once and for all.
 In Metro: Last Light (2013), faction Red Line used an biochemically engineered Ebola strain stolen from D6 military facility. It was used to wipe out the opposing factions.
 In the Fallout series, F.E.V. (Forced Evolutionary Virus) was created by the US government in an effort to protect their soldiers from biological weapons deployed by the Chinese military that were ravaging civilian populations. The results of this Pan-Immunity Virion Project was the FEV, a virus that provides immunity to human pathogens, near-immunity to radiation, increases strength and intelligence (in unmutated humans, humans with mutations from radiation or substrains of FEV lose intelligence upon infection), while simultaneously sterilizing the host and eliminating secondary sexual characteristics, making them all outwardly male in appearance. FEV has unpredictable effects on other animals and it is a partial contributor to the mutated beasts you encounter throughout the wasteland. There is also the US developed New Plague (a.k.a. Blue Flu). Code-named Limit 115, it was developed by the US government in secret as a sterilization agent for use against the Chinese (people who survived the deadly virus were usually rendered sterile), Chinese agents managed to get their hands on it however and it was accidentally released during their escape causing a national outbreak in the heart of the US. The symptoms are generally flu like at first with hemorrhagic-fever like features in the late-stage. It usually took 3–5 days from onset of symptoms to death.
 In Hitman, Agent 47 is tasked with assassinating an Italian bio-engineer named Silvio Caruso, who is creating a bioweapon capable of rapidly spreading and laying dormant within an area until it detects its target's DNA, killing them.
 In the new Old Man campaign in Arma 3, a modified strain of malaria hits the fictional nation of Tanoa. CSAT scientists have engineered it and called it the Atrox strain, which is capable of killing someone within hours. It was used as a method of subversion to expand CSAT's sphere of influence.

See also
 Weapons of mass destruction in popular culture

References

 
Genetic engineering in fiction
Weapons of mass destruction in fiction
Works about violence